The 1980 McDonald's All-American Boys Game was an All-star basketball game played on Saturday, April 12, 1980 at the Oakland Coliseum Arena in Oakland, California. The game's rosters featured the best and most highly recruited high school boys graduating in 1980. The game was the 3rd annual version of the McDonald's All-American Game first played in 1978.

1980 game
The game was not televised, but highlights were aired by NBC Sports during Sportsworld on April 13. The East roster could count on two promising big men, Earl Jones and Sam Perkins; the West had guard Doc Rivers and centers Russell Cross and Tim McCormick. The game saw the West prevail 135-111 thanks to the scoring efforts of Cross (20 points), Rivers (20), Kenny Fields (18) and James Banks (16). The top scorer for the East was Gary Springer with 18 points. Sam Perkins scored 12 points and had 24 rebounds, an all-time record for the McDonald's game. Russell Cross, who scored 12 of his 15 free throws in addition to 4 field goals, received the MVP award. Of the 25 players, 13 went on to play at least 1 game in the NBA.

East roster

West roster

Coaches
The East team was coached by:
 Head Coach John Wood of Spingarn High School (Washington, D.C.)

The West team was coached by:
 Head Coach Nick Robertson of McMinnville High School (McMinnville, Oregon)

References

External links
McDonald's All-American on the web
McDonald's All-American all-time rosters
McDonald's All-American rosters at Basketball-Reference.com
Game stats at Realgm.com

1979–80 in American basketball
1980
1980 in sports in California
Basketball competitions in Oakland, California